Setsuko Matsunaga Nishi (née Setsuko Matsunaga; October 17, 1921 – November 18, 2012) was a pioneering community activist and researcher in the area of American race relations as well as professor of sociology at the City University of New York where she taught the first courses on Asian American studies.

Early life and education
Born in Los Angeles, Nishi was the daughter of Hatsu and Tahei Matsunaga who had emigrated to the United States from Kumamoto, Japan. Her father was a hotel owner in the Little Tokyo district of Los Angeles. She attended Theodore Roosevelt High School before enrolling as a music student at the University of Southern California. A trained classical pianist, she often played with her sister Helen who was a violinist. Despite writing a telegram to President Roosevelt complaining about "internment as undemocratic", she had to interrupt her studies and her music career in spring 1942 when, as Japanese Americans, she and her family were incarcerated at the Santa Anita Assembly Center following the Japanese attack on Pearl Harbor and signing of Executive Order 9066.

Five months later, in the fall of 1942, she and her sister were among the first students to leave the internment camp thanks to the efforts of the National Japanese American Student Relocation Council. Nishi then studied sociology at Washington University in St. Louis where she earned a master's degree in 1944. She completed her education at the sociology department of the University of Chicago where she ultimately received a doctorate in 1963.

Career
In Chicago, Nishi married the painter Ken Nishi in 1944 and they subsequently started a family with the birth of a son, Geoffrey. Nishi took up employment at the Pittsburgh Courier where she became the assistant of the editor, her African-American friend and supporter, P.L. Prattis. Prattis introduced her to fellow American sociologist Horace R. Cayton who helped her found the Chicago Resettlers Committee, later known as the Japanese American Service Committee. In that connection, in 1946 she published the widely distributed pamphlet Facts About Japanese Americans. In the late 1940s, she headed the Chicago Council Against Racial and Religious Discrimination which coordinated civil rights and labour groups.

In the early 1950s, the Nishis moved to Tappan, New York, where they had four more children. Nishi worked as a researcher for the National Council of Churches. With Horace Cayton, she wrote The Changing Scene (1955), a study of churches and social service.

In 1965, Nishi became professor of sociology at Brooklyn College, also teaching at the Graduate Center of the City University of New York. At Brooklyn, she delivered the first courses on Asian American studies, creating a new generation of scholars. In the 1970s, she joined the  New York State Advisory Committee, which reported to the U.S. Commission on Civil Rights. She served on the committee for three decades, ultimately becoming its chair. During her teaching career, she had increasingly combined her academic assignments with community involvement. She retired in 1999.

Later life and distinctions
In 2001, her husband Ken died. Nishi devoted her final years to work on the large-scale Japanese American Life Course Survey which reviewed the effects of the wartime internment of Japanese Americans. In 2007, she received a Lifetime Achievement Award from the Association for Asian American Studies and, in 2009, she was awarded the Order of the Rising Sun, Gold Rays with Neck Ribbon, by the Japanese government.

Nishi died in Cape Breton, Canada, on November 18, 2012. She is survived by her five children: Geoffrey, Lisa, Paula, Stefani, and Mia, and six grandchildren: Emiko, Lian, Mia, Béla, James, and Chloe.

Publications

References

1921 births
2012 deaths
American sociologists
City University of New York faculty
American women social scientists
American women writers
USC Thornton School of Music alumni
Japanese-American internees
People from Los Angeles
Recipients of the Order of the Rising Sun, 3rd class
American women sociologists
Japanese-American civil rights activists
American academics of Japanese descent
Activists from California
Brooklyn College faculty
Graduate Center, CUNY faculty
20th-century American women
21st-century American women